Headhunter is the seventh studio album by the Swiss hard rock band Krokus, released in 1983. It achieved Gold status in the United States. The track "Screaming in the Night" was the band's biggest hit to date, and is still played on classic rock radio stations. Headhunter is the only Krokus album to feature Steve Pace on drums, and includes the Bachman–Turner Overdrive cover "Stayed Awake All Night".

UK-based company Rock Candy Records reissued the album on CD in 2014.

Track listing 
Side one
 "Headhunter" (Chris von Rohr, Fernando von Arb, Marc Storace, Butch Stone) – 4:30
 "Eat the Rich" (von Rohr, von Arb, Storace, Stone) – 4:14
 "Screaming in the Night" (von Rohr, von Arb, Mark Kohler, Storace, Stone) – 6:38
 "Ready to Burn" (von Rohr, von Arb, Kohler, Storace, Stone) – 3:54
Side two
"Night Wolf" (von Rohr, von Arb, Storace, Stone)  – 4:10 (written for the animated motion picture Metal Hollywood)
 "Stayed Awake All Night" (Randy Bachman) – 4:41 (Bachman–Turner Overdrive cover)
 "Stand and Be Counted" (von Rohr, von Arb, Storace, Stone) – 4:07
 "White Din" (von Rohr, von Arb) – 1:50
 "Russian Winter" (von Rohr, von Arb, Storace, Stone) – 3:31

Personnel
Krokus
Marc Storace – lead vocals
Fernando von Arb – lead and rhythm guitar, bass, piano
Mark Kohler – rhythm and lead guitar, bass
Chris von Rohr – bass, piano, drums, percussion
Steve Pace – drums, percussion

Additional musicians
Rob Halford – backing vocals on "Ready to Burn"
Jimi Jamison – backing vocals on "Screaming in the Night"
Bob Ketchum – sound effects recorded at Cedar Crest Studios

Production
Tom Allom – producer
Andy De Ganahl – engineer
Butch Stone – director

Charts

Album

Singles

Certifications

References

Krokus (band) albums
1983 albums
Albums produced by Tom Allom
Arista Records albums